The Palm Pixi and Pixi Plus are multimedia smartphones, developed by Palm, which was purchased in 2010 by HP. The device is viewed as a successor to the Palm Centro smartphone and was Palm's second webOS device, after the Palm Pre.

The phones were considered the smallest "smartphone" on the market and are able to browse the internet, and access Facebook and other social media sites, as well as online banking.

The original Pixi was announced on September 8, 2009, on Palm's official blog and was released on November 15, 2009, on the Sprint carrier network in the U.S.

The Pixi Plus was announced at CES in 2010. The Plus versions include WiFi and the ability to act as a 3G Mobile hotspot (sometimes known as MiFi). The phone was released January 7, 2010, for the Verizon Wireless carrier network, and subsequently for AT&T Mobility, and was released on May 28, 2010, for O2 in the United Kingdom.

Specifications
The Pixi has both touchscreen capability and a QWERTY keyboard with soft gel keycaps. To access the battery and interior hardware of the phone, the soft-touch plastic rear cover is removable.

Palm, Inc. detailed the specifications of the Palm Pixi on the company's product web page. According to the information given, the Pixi features a 2.63-inch capacitive touchscreen with an 18-bit color 320x400 screen resolution Sub-HVGA display. The device weighs 92.5 grams (3.51 ounces) and is 55.0 mm (2.17 inches) in width, 111.0 mm (4.37 inches) in height and 10.85 mm (0.43 inches) thick. On board radios include GPS, Dual-band CDMA2000 and 3G EVDO Rev A data networking. E-mail supports Microsoft Exchange services and direct push, as well as POP3, IMAP, Yahoo! Mail, Gmail, AOL and Microsoft Outlook. Messaging features include IM, SMS and MMS. It features a 2 megapixel camera with LED flash, proximity sensor, accelerometer, Bluetooth 2.1 (with A2DP stereo), MicroUSB connector, 3.5 mm headphone jack and 8 gigabytes of flash memory (roughly 7 gigabytes is available to the user).

Like the Palm Pre, the Pixi features webOS, which includes over-the-air Synergy synchronization.

The Pixi Plus has the same display as the Pixi. The hardware specs include a Qualcomm MSM7627 (600 MHz) CPU, Adreno 200 graphics, 8GB of storage, 256 MB of RAM, 802.11 b/g Wifi and Bluetooth 2.1. It is capable of using HSDPA (up to 3.6 Mbit/s) as well as GPRS and offers A-GPS for navigation and location services. The battery is a changeable 1,150 mAh unit with 5.5h talk time (2G) and 350h standby, according to the manufacturer. The sole camera is a 2 megapixel fixed-focus unit on the rear paired with an LED flash.

Touchstone wireless charging compatibility is optional and requires an separate back cover.

References

External links
 Gizmodo Palm Pixi first impressions
 Palm Pixi Specs
 Palm Pixi Hardware Demo

Palm, Inc.
WebOS
Palm mobile phones
Linux-based devices
Smartphones
Mobile phones introduced in 2009
Mobile phones with an integrated hardware keyboard